Conspica inconspicua is a moth of the family Erebidae first described by Michael Fibiger in 2010. It is known from Thailand.

The wingspan is about 9 mm. The head, patagia, tegulae, thorax, and all areas of the forewing, including the fringes are grey suffused with brown dots, but the costal part of the forewing is considerably darker brownish grey than rest of the wing. The antemedial and postmedial lines are brown and broad and the terminal line is marked by black interneural dots. The hindwing is light grey, but darker towards the termen. The terminal line is brown, with an indistinct discal spot. The fringes are whitish. The underside of the forewing is light grey and the underside of the hindwing is whitish with a discal spot.

References

Micronoctuini
Moths described in 2010